Katherine Elizabeth Espín Gómez (born 15 November 1992 in La Troncal) is an Ecuadorian model, lawyer, and beauty queen who held the Miss Earth Ecuador 2016. She is best known as the winner of the Miss Earth 2016 pageant, making her the second Miss Earth winner from Ecuador next to Olga Álava who won the crown in 2011. She is also the National Director of Miss Earth Ecuador pageant at present.

Biography

Early life
Espín was born in La Troncal in the Cañar Province of Ecuador with her parents, Freddy Espín and Orsa Gómez.

As published in Miss Earth's official website, Espin described her childhood days as the following:

Pageantry
Prior to competing in the Miss Earth pageant, Espin represented Ecuador but did not win at the Reinado Internacional del Café 2013, but she emerged first runner in the Miss Bikini Universe 2015.

Miss Earth 2016
Espin represented Ecuador in Miss Earth 2016 and competed with 82 other delegates from around the world. During the pre-pageant events, she won gold medal at the press presentation as part of the "Darling of the Press" award and tied up with the Philippines' bet, Imelda Schweighart. As the pre-pageant activities continued, she garnered more medals: gold medals for the resort's wear and long gown competitions; silver medals for the swimsuit competition; bronze medal for the national costume competition. Aside from getting several medals, Espin was able to get awards from various sponsors as well. At the end of the pageant, Espin won Miss Earth 2016.

In an interview with the media, she stated that she had been wanting to be Miss Earth since she was 16 years old and she further stated that to reporters, "There was an Ecuadorian named Olga Alava, [who] won the pageant, and I remembered that when I saw her, I saw myself winning and I'm making my dream come true."

Miss Earth reign
Espin returned to Ecuador after winning Miss Earth after nearly two months of traveling in the Philippines promoting environmental awareness, media appearances including guesting in New York City. She arrived on December 7, 2016 at the José Joaquín de Olmedo International Airport in Guayaquil and a press conference was held for her victory in Miss Earth including a motorcade from the airport to her hometown La Troncal and received with placards with her name, cheers and shouts from the balconies and in the streets on her triumph.

Espin and Miss Earth Air 2016 Michelle Gomez travelled to Reunion Island for the coronation of Miss Earth Reunion 2017, and conducted environmental campaign at the Charles Cros -Mont Ver Les Hauts School and led tree planting activity with the students, and visited ecotourism spots and toured the island's electric car company, Renault.

In April 2017, Espin flew to Angola for the Earth Day 2017 and for the crowning of Miss Earth Angola 2017 and also graced a tree planting activity together with Fundacao Verde with the support of the Government of Angola and the Ministerio do Ambiente. On the same month, Espin  graced the launch of Miss Earth Ghana Organization's "Trash in Bin Campaign" in Ghana with Miss Earth Ghana 2016 Deborah Eyram Dodor and promoted proper waste disposal and segregation.

Espin graced the red carpet at the State of the Nation Address (SONA) of the Philippine President Rodrigo Duterte at the Batasang Pambansa Complex on July 24, 2017 and she was joined by Isabela vice governor Tonypet Albano.

In July 2017, Espin travelled in Singapore as an honorary member along with thirty-three delegates from the League of Vice Governors of the Philippines to attend the foreign study "Driving Excellence in Governance" at the National University of Singapore's Lee Kuan Yew School of Public Policy (NUS-LKYSPP), which is the academic phase project funded under the General Appropriations Act, was overseen by the Development Academy of the Philippines.

She travelled to Puerto Rico in August 2017 to attend the Miss Earth Puerto Rico 2017 where she crowned Karla Victoria Aponte .

In September 2017, she went to Chile and graced the activities of the contest, Nuestra Belleza Chile 2017 (Miss Earth Chile 2017) and served as the chairwoman of the board of judges of the pageant which was won by Sofía Manzur.

She became an Ecotourism Ambassador in the Philippines, an honorary member in the League of Vice Governors in Asia, worked with the Liter of Light Foundation globally, and received the national award of "Honorable Citizen" in Ecuador for her accomplishments as an advocate of environmental preservation.

During her reign, she has traveled to Angola, Ghana, Reunion Island, Singapore, United States, Middle East, Puerto Rico, Chile and numerous trips around the Philippines.

References

External links

 Miss Earth Ecuador 2016 Eco-Beauty Video
 Katherine Espin  at Miss Earth Official Website

1992 births
Living people
Miss World Ecuador
Miss Earth 2016 contestants
Ecuadorian beauty pageant winners
Ecuadorian female models
Ecuadorian people of Spanish descent
People from La Troncal Canton
Ecuadorian emigrants to the United States
Miss Earth winners
21st-century Ecuadorian women